The Leeds Cup is a golf tournament that has been played annually in northern England since 1902. The event is organised by the north region of the Professional Golfers' Association. It is the oldest trophy in professional golf that is still played for. The Tooting Bec Cup is older, having been first played for in 1901, but is no longer contested.

The Leeds Challenge Cup was first contested in May 1902 at Leeds Golf Club. The trophy was presented by Alderman Penrose-Green, Lord Mayor of Leeds and President of Leeds Golf Club to be competed for annually by professional golfers. Harry Vardon was the first winner. 2015 marked the 100th staging of the event.

History
The Northern Counties Professional Golfers' Association was formed as a result of a meeting in Leeds on 9 January 1902. At a subsequent meeting, also in Leeds, on 24 March it was decided that, subject to certain conditions, it would amalgamate with the London-based Professional Golfers' Association and become the northern section of the new enlarged association. The same meeting also agreed to accept an offer from the Leeds Golf Club to host a tournament on 6 May at which the club would provide a prize.

The tournament was contested over 36 holes of stroke play, on a single day. The winner received the Challenge Cup, a memento and the first of six small prizes. There was also a prize for the first apprentice. It was the third tournament organised by the PGA with the Tooting Bec Cup having been contested in October 1901, followed by a tournament at Royal Mid-Surrey Golf Club on 23 April 1902.

The weather on 6 June was wintry and the professionals had to play in a blinding hailstorm which also made putting difficult. 26 professionals entered included three times Open Champions J.H. Taylor and Harry Vardon and Sandy Herd, twice runner-up in the Open. James Braid was absent, having a prior engagement. Vardon won the cup with score of 149, his second round 73 being the best of the day. Herd and Taylor tied for second place on 153. Bertie Snowball, then a young professional at Bradford, won the apprentice prize. 21 of the 26 players returned scores for the two rounds. Mrs Penrose-Green presented the cup to Vardon and Taylor made a short speech thanking the members of the Leeds club.

Winners

1977 Howard Clark
1978 Michael Nutter
1979 Garry Logan
1980 David Jagger
1981 Alec Bickerdike
1982 Mike Ingham
1983 Martin Foster
1984 Donald Stirling
1985 Bob Longworth
1986 Chris Gray
1987 Steve Rolley
1988 Gordon J. Brand
1989 Paul Affleck
1990 Donald Stirling
1991 Simon Townend
1992 Paul Carman
1993 Ged Furey
1994 Donald Stirling
1995 Raife Hutt
1996 Mike Archer
1997 Peter Scott
1998 Neil Price
1999 Mike Bradley
2000 Phillip Archer
2001 Robert Giles
2002 Graeme Bell
2003 Jonathan Cheetham
2004 James Godbold
2005 Simon Edwards
2006 Neil Price
2007 John Wells
2008 Scott Barber
2009 Chris Clarke
2010 Steve Parry
2011 David Smith
2012 Garry Houston
2013 Nick Ludwell
2014 Ben Mason
2015 Garry Houston
2016 Phillip Archer
2017 Michael Ramsden
2018 Jason Shufflebotham
2019 Gareth Davies
2020 Haydn McCullen
2021 Phillip Archer
2022 Phillip Archer

Source:

In 1912 McEwan beat Pulford 78 to 83 in the playoff, played the following day. In 1913 Hambleton beat Beck 40 to 43 in the playoff, played the same evening. In 1919 Ray beat Whiting 40 to 46 in the playoff, played the same evening. In 1926 Compston beat Fryer 72 to 76 in the playoff, played the same evening. In 1932 Kenyon beat Taggart 71 to 74 in the playoff, played the following day. In 1933 Jarman beat Ballantine 72 to 74 in the playoff, played the following day. In 1935 Jowle beat Fallon 72 to 73 in the playoff, played the following day. In 1947 Green beat Jowle 137 to 139 in the playoff, played the following day. In 1950 Scott beat Kenyon 72 to 76 in the playoff, played the same evening. In 1951 Sutton beat Howard 68 to 75 in the playoff, played the same evening.

The 1904 and 1905 contests were the northern section qualifying events for the News of the World Matchplay. From 1911 to 1914 the cup was awarded to the winner of the northern section qualifying competition for the Sphere and Tatler Foursomes Tournament. From 1920 to 1927 and from 1948 to 1950 the cup was awarded to the winner of the northern section qualifying competition for the Daily Mail Tournament. From 1930 to 1939 and in 1946, 1947, 1951, 1955 and 1961 the cup was awarded to the winner of the northern section qualifying competition for the News of the World Matchplay. From 1952 to 1954 the cup was held in connection with qualifying for the Goodwin Foursomes. In 1956 it was held in connection with qualifying for the Goodwin Tournament and similarly in 1959 for the Sherwood Forest Foursomes Tournament.

In 1937 the event was combined with the 72-hole Northern Professional Championship; the Leeds Cup and qualifying for the News of the World Matchplay being based on the first two rounds. Ties for qualifying places were determined by the third round scores in the Northern Professional Championship. The same system was used in 1946 when the Northern Professional Championship was revived. In 1947 the Northern Professional Championship was reduced to 36 holes and the two events were combined. In 1948 the events were again separated with the Leeds Cup being used for the qualifying for the Daily Mail Tournament, the Northern Professional Championship being used for the News of the World Matchplay qualifying. The Daily Mail Tournament was not held in 1951 and the Leeds Cup was contested, as in 1947, at the same time as the Northern Professional Championship.

References

Golf tournaments in England
1902 establishments in England